WiredTiger is a NoSQL, Open Source extensible platform for data management. It is released under version 2 or 3 of the GNU General Public License. WiredTiger uses MultiVersion Concurrency Control (MVCC) architecture.

MongoDB acquired WiredTiger Inc. on December 16, 2014. The WiredTiger storage engine was made available as an optional storage engine in MongoDB 2.8. Early WiredTiger users included Amazon and Connectifier. The WiredTiger storage engine is the default storage engine starting in MongoDB version 3.2. It provides a document-level concurrency model, checkpointing, and compression, among other features. In MongoDB Enterprise, WiredTiger also supports Encryption At Rest.

References

Further reading
 
 Wolpe, Toby (December 16, 2014). "MongoDB snaps up WiredTiger and its storage expert team". ZDNet. Accessed July 8, 2016.
 
 
  
 
 

NoSQL